Editorial Salvat (Salvat Publisher) is a Spanish–Catalan publishing company created in 1898 in Barcelona. In the 20th century it was widely known for its encyclopedias. At present it belongs to the French group Hachette-Matra.

Early History 
The company Espasa Hermanos y Salvat, a forerunner of the publishing houses Espasa i Salvat, was created in 1869 by Manuel Salvat i Xivixell (1842-1901) and the brothers Pau (1835-1927) and Josep Espasa i Anguera (1840-1911). Manuel Salvat married Magdalena Espasa, his partners' sister, in 1872, and the new couple moved to the same house where the printing press was located on Carrer Robador. Pau Espasa retired from the company in 1877. In 1881 Josep Espasa reached an agreement with his brother-in-law Manuel Salvat to form Espasa y Compañía. In 1897 Salvat left the company and in 1898 he created Salvat e Hijo, in which his son, the architect Pau Salvat i Espasa, took part. When he died, Manuel Salvat was succeeded as director by his son Pau, who gave a major boost to the company. In his role as an architect, Pau Salvat was the author in 1916 of the modernist building of his publishing house, located at Carrer de Mallorca, 39. In its origins, the Salvat publishing house published works such as Hojas selectas, in the writers from Spain and America collaborated for about twenty years. Between 1906 and 1914 the 9 volumes of the Diccionario Salvat Enciclopédico Popular Ilustrado were published, and the 12 volumes of the Diccionario enciclopédico Salvat, as well as the Diccionari de la Llengua Catalana (1910) and the Historia del Arte (1914). The company set up a distributor together with Gustau Gili in Buenos Aires, where it opened its first American branch.

Pau Salvat died prematurely in 1923 and was succeeded by his brothers Ferran and Santiago Salvat i Espasa (Barcelona, 1891-1971). That year, the company changed its name to Salvat Editores, S.A. Ferran and Santiago modernized the company in the 1920s and 1930s, and made it one of the industry leaders in the state, incorporating advances in machinery and distribution. During this time he published Surgery, Theoretical-Practical Treatise on Surgical Pathology and Clinic (1925), the History of the World (1926) by Josep Pijoan, the Wery Agricultural Encyclopedia (1928) and the Saved Geographical Atlas (1928). In 1932 he separated the printing business from publishing, creating the company Imprenta Hispano-Americana S.A.

Civil War 
The Spanish Civil War and the postwar period brought censorship and economic hardship, and the company did not recover until the mid-1950s, when it intensified its presence in Latin America, with subsidiaries in Argentina, Mexico, Venezuela, Brazil and Colombia, and edited the encyclopedia El mundo de los niños (1958), and published in Catalan the Costumari Català (1950-56), by Joan Amades, in five volumes, republished in 1982.

In 1965, Salvat introduced Monitor, the first modern encyclopedia of the time with kiosk issues, and in 1969 the first edition of the Diccionario Enciclopédico Salvat Universal was published. He published the Encyclopedia Salvat de la Fauna (1970-73), directed by Félix Rodríguez de la Fuente and the Basic Library of Universal Classics in conjunction with RTVE. At the end of the 1960s he closed the printing house in Barcelona, which he moved to Sant Boi de Llobregat and in 1968 he opened Gráficas Estella, an industrial plant located in Navarre. He allied with De Agostini to serve the French-speaking, German-speaking and English-speaking market, successfully in France where Manuel Salvat, the founder's grandson, was among the first publishers. In the mid-1970s, the company had 4,000 employees. In Catalan he published the encyclopedic dictionary Salvat Català (1974-77), in 8 volumes, and the Història de Catalunya (1978-79), in 6 volumes.

French Buyout 
In 1988, the publishing house was acquired by the French multinational Hachette. In 1992, the Lagardère Group merged Matra, a new technology company, and Hachette, a communications company, to form Hachette-Matra.

References

External links 

 Official website

Organizations established in 1898
Companies based in Catalonia
Companies based in Barcelona
Spanish subsidiaries of foreign companies
Publishing companies of Spain
Publishing companies of France